Jamaica is a musical with a book by Yip Harburg and Fred Saidy, lyrics by Harburg, and music by Harold Arlen. It is set on a small island off the coast of Jamaica, and tells about a simple island community fighting to avoid being overrun by American commercialism.

Arlen's music parodies the popular form of Calypso, which was in vogue in the 1950s, largely as a result of the popularity of Harry Belafonte, for whom the musical originally was written. Belafonte withdrew from the production due to illness, and the musical was tailored around the talents of Lena Horne.  Harburg was blacklisted in Hollywood at the time of the writing of the musical, and the satire is unusually pointed. Many of the topics raised in the songs, including evolution, nuclear energy, and consumerism, remain topical today.

Productions

The musical opened in Philadelphia. Later, it moved to Broadway, opening at the Imperial Theatre on October 31, 1957 and closed on April 11, 1959 after 558 performances. The musical was directed by Robert Lewis and produced by David Merrick, with choreography by Jack Cole, scenic Design by Oliver Smith, costume design by Miles White and lighting design by Jean Rosenthal. The cast included Ricardo Montalbán as Koli and Lena Horne as Savannah, with Ossie Davis as Cicero, Erik Rhodes as Governor, Adelaide Hall as Grandma Obeah, and Josephine Premice as Ginger. Alvin Ailey was the principal dancer.

The song "Boy, Girl, and Island" was originally written for the play, but was cut and replaced by "Take It Slow, Joe."

An original cast recording was released by RCA Victor.

Synopsis
Savannah, a beautiful island girl, longs to escape to New York City to live a life of modern conveniences. She is tempted to accept the marriage proposal of a New York businessman visiting the island. However, when Koli, an impoverished fisherman, saves her younger brother's life during a hurricane, she opts to remain with him.

Cast of characters (in order of appearance)

  
 Koli
 Quico
 Savannah
 Grandma Obeah
 Ginger
 Snodgrass
 Hucklebuck
 Island Women

 The Governor
 Cicero
 Lancaster
 First Ship's Officer
 Second Ship's Officer
 Joe Nashua
 Dock Worker
 Radio Announcer

Song list

  
Act I
Savannah
Savannah's Wedding Day
Pretty to Walk With
Push the Button
Incompatibility
Little Biscuit
Cocoanut Sweet
Pity the Sunset
Yankee Dollar
What Good Does It Do?
Monkey in the Mango Tree
Take It Slow, Joe
Ain't It the Truth

Act II
Leave the Atom Alone
Coconut Sweet (Reprise)
For Every Fish
I Don't Think I'll End It All Today
Napoleon Is a Pastry
Ain't It the Truth (Reprise)
Savannah (Reprise)

Awards and nominations

Original Broadway production

References

External links
Internet Broadway Database listing
Guide to Musical Theatre - Jamaica
Time Magazine review

1957 musicals
Broadway musicals
Musicals by Harold Arlen
Jamaica in fiction